The Critic is an American psychological thriller short film written and directed by Stella Velon. It is the story of an award-winning actress who faces her harshest critic during an interview gone wrong. The film stars Stella Velon and Alan Smyth, and explores themes of fame, drug addiction, mental health and impostor syndrome. The Critic had its world premiere at the Boston Film Festival in September 2018 and it was first released on Amazon Prime Video in June 2019 as part of Amazon Studios' inaugural All Voices Film Festival, where it was named one of the five winning films.

In 2020, the film was nominated for a Webby Award out of 13,000 entries worldwide in the Best Individual Performance category.

Synopsis

An award-winning actress with a troubled past, goes for an interview after a major win. The interview takes a wrong turn and proves to be a lot more than just that. The Critic provides a glimpse into the darker side of fame and serves as a social commentary on the value we place on art.

Cast

 Stella Velon as Actress
 Alan Smyth as Interviewer
 Todd Karner as Director

Reception 

The Critic received 5-star reviews from UK Film Review and Indie Shorts Mag. The Independent Critic rated it 3.5 out of 4 and Film Threat gave it 8 out of 10 stars, describing Velon’s performance as "excellent and poignant."

One Film Fan, called The Critic, "A quietly fierce, dramatically potent, and heartbreakingly palpable exercise in what could very well be one of the most impactful inward looks at the realities found within the celebrity mindset."

The Independent Critic described the film as "a remarkably poignant story that somehow manages to travel a broad emotional spectrum while delivering a complete story within its modest 15-minute running time."

UK Film Review called the film "a particularly poignant piece of cinema in the current social climate". Indie Shorts Mag elected the film their "Editor's Pick – The Best Of All, From 2018!" in which they wrote, "Of all the films of 2018, the best of it all had to be 'The Critic', for its sheer content and consistency with regards to performance and execution from all quarters."

On the review aggregator website Letterboxd the film holds an average rating of 3.4/5 based on 121 reviews.

Accolades

References

External links
 
 
 
 

2019 films
2019 short films
American short films
2010s English-language films